Andrew B. Sterling (August 26, 1874 – August 11, 1955) was an American lyricist.

Biography
Born in New York City, after he graduated from high school, he began writing songs and vaudevilles. An important event was his meeting with the composer Harry Von Tilzer in 1898. The two began a songwriting partnership that lasted almost 30 years.

Others that Sterling collaborated with include Arthur Lange, Gus Edwards, Bernie Grossman, M. K. Jerome, William Jerome, Frederick Allen Mills, his brother Raymond Sterling, Ray Henderson, Edward Moran and Bartley Costello.

Sterling wrote the songs Meet Me in St. Louis, Louis in 1904 and Wait 'Till the Sun Shines, Nellie in 1905. He wrote the song America, Here's My Boy for the Peerless Quartet in 1917 in the aftermath of U.S. entry into World War I in April 1917. He wrote On the Old Fall River Line with Von Tilzer and W. Jerome. He worked with Von Tilzer on the classic Pick Me Up and Lay Me Down in Dear Old Dixieland. Other songs for which Sterling wrote the lyrics in whole or part include After the War is Over (1918) and When My Baby Smiles at Me (1920).

Sterling died in Stamford, Connecticut on August 11, 1955.

He was inducted into the Songwriters Hall of Fame in 1970.

Selected works
 with Von Tilzer, My Old New Hampshire Home, 1898
 with Arthur Lange, A Mother's Prayer for Her Boy Out There, New York: Joe Morris Music Co, 1917. 
 with Arthur Lange, America, Here's My Boy,  New York: Joe Morris Music Co, 1917. 
 with Von Tilzer and W. Jerome, On the Old Fall River Line
 with Von Tilzer, Pick Me Up and Lay Me Down in Dear Old Dixieland
 Von Tilzer, Harry, and Andrew B. Sterling. Under the American Flag. New York: Harry Von Tilzer Music Pub. Co, 1915. 
 Wait 'till the Sun Shines, Nellie, 1905
 with Arthur Lange, What'll We Do With Him Boy's? New York: Joe Morris Music Co., 1918.  
 with Arthur Lange, Bernie Grossman, and Starmer. We're Going Over the Top. New York: Joe Morris Music Co, 1918. 
Von Tilzer, Harry, and Andrew B. Sterling. You'll Have to Put Him to Sleep with the Marseillaise and Wake Him Up with a Oo-La-La. New York: Harry Von Tilzer Music Co., 1918. 
 with Charles B Ward, Strike Up The Band (Here Comes a Sailor)

References

External links

Sheet music for his song "Under the Anheuser Bush" from the collection of the San Francisco Public Library
Words and music for "Strike Up the Band (Here Comes a Sailor)" written with Charles B. Ward in 1900
 Andrew B. Sterling recordings at the Discography of American Historical Recordings.

1874 births
1955 deaths
Songwriters from New York (state)
Musicians from New York City
Ragtime composers